Daddy's Gone A-Hunting is a 1925 American silent drama film directed by Frank Borzage based upon a play by Zoë Akins, with adaptation by Kenneth B. Clarke. The film brought together Vitagraph leading lady Alice Joyce and English actor Percy Marmont after his success with If Winter Comes. This is the only film either of the main stars made for MGM. The film was remade in 1931 as Women Love Once. A print survives in the Národní filmový archiv.

Plot
Julian (Percy Marmont) is a poor artist who lives with wife Edith (Alice Joyce) and their newborn baby in Harlem. Struggling to make ends meet, he foregoes his artistic calling and draws for magazines.

Reaching his limits, Julian convinces his wife he could reach higher grounds if he were to go to Paris. He moves to Paris while his Edith works at a shop on Fifth Avenue. Each of their lives evolves differently — Edith is courted by a wealthy suitor whom she ignores while pining for her husband, while Julian fails to meet his goals in Paris, returning defeated back to New York City three years later. Their child dies, and the meeting of Julian and Edith highlight how different their routes have been.

Cast

References

External links

 
 Article at the Silent Film Still Archive
 Still at silentfilmstillarchive.com
  (German intertitles)

1925 films
Metro-Goldwyn-Mayer films
American silent feature films
1925 drama films
American black-and-white films
Films directed by Frank Borzage
Silent American drama films
1920s American films
1920s English-language films